Holly Lake Ranch is an unincorporated, gated, golf course community managed by a homeowner's association and located in Texas. There is an allied Silver Leaf Resorts community of the same name at the location as well.

Holly Lake Ranch is a census-designated place (CDP) in Wood County, Texas, United States. This was a new CDP for the 2010 census with a population of 2774.

Geography
Holly Lake Ranch is located at  (32.713177, -95.199372).

Early history
In 1900, D.B. Contes, a cotton buyer from central Texas, moved into the area along Holly Creek off the Big Sandy Creek in this area of Wood County. During World War I and the Great Depression, Contes leased and sold hunting and fishing rights to city residents in 2,700 acre holdings around what would become Holly Lake.

Holly Creek was later dammed to make a place for what is now Holly Lake, and cabins were erected at the lake and along Big Sandy Creek.

Expansion and Development 
In 1964, Contes sold his interest to E.G. Rodman, an oilman from Odessa, Texas. Rodman built a large home on the lake, and purchased additional land to add to the original 2,700 acres. The cattle ranch the acquisition formed was named Holly Lake Ranch. In December 1969, Dallas real estate developers Bill McKenzie and Jack Wilson executed a contract to purchase the 4,165 acre Holly Lake Ranch property Rodman had assembled. Alex McKenzie and Allen Campbell were financial backers of the project which was named Holly Lake Development Company.

Holly Lake Development company began the development and execution of a master plan. Today, that master plan is largely reflected in the design of Holly Lake Ranch.

An administration building, restaurant, activity center, and condominiums were developed in 1972 and 1973.

Current Status 
The Holly Lake Ranch cabins and lodging are today managed by Holiday Inn Resorts.

Holly Lake Ranch contains a total of 4,165 acres. In addition to sites for an 18-hole golf course, 210 acre lake, an additional 43-acre lake, three smaller lakes, sports courts, ranges, and grounds, and a sandy beach, Holly Lake Ranch contains 3,342 single family lots with 2,050 homes completed as of January 1, 2010.

The community was formally established in 1971 and features a golf course designed by Leon Howard.

References

Golf clubs and courses in Texas
Census-designated places in Wood County, Texas
Census-designated places in Texas
Unincorporated communities in Wood County, Texas
Unincorporated communities in Texas